St John the Baptist Church is a Roman Catholic church in Toodyay, Western Australia, part of a group of church buildings. It was built and consecrated in 1963. It is the second church of that name, replacing the one built in 1863.

The new church replaced the original St John the Baptist Church across the road.  The older building was in poor repair, and in 1963 when the standard gauge railway line also came through in close proximity a decision was made to re-locate. After fundraising and support from the shire and local businesses the church was officially opened on 17 November 1963 with the blessing of M. McKeon, Auxiliary Bishop of Perth.  The altar and tabernacle of the new church were donated by the O'Connor estate. A brass plaque, transferred from the former church, commemorates the contribution of the Quinlan family.

Priests who have administered to the Parish since the consecration of the church are:

 1958-67 Fr John Chokolich 
 1967    Fr Alex Morahan
 1968-72 Fr Carmelo Di Giorgio
 1972    Fr W. de Bruyn
 1974-81 Fr John E.C. Lisle
 1981-84 Fr Reginald Smith
 1984-86 Fr T. McDonald
 1986-92 Fr T. Hewitt
 1993-94 Fr Kevin Hay
 April - Nov 1994 Fr Pat Russell

Then served and cared for from Northam:

 1995-96 Fr Greg Donovan
 1997    Fr Kaz Stuglik
 1998-2000 Fr Robert Carrillo
 2001-04 Frs Stephen Casey & James D'Souza
 2004-06 Fr Geoff Aldous
 2006-11 Frs Andrew Bowron & Richard Ye Myint
 2012    Frs Dominic Savio & Richard Ye Myint
 2013    Frs Pavol Herda & Emmanuel Dimobi

References

Buildings and structures in Toodyay, Western Australia
Roman Catholic churches in Western Australia
Stirling Terrace, Toodyay
State Register of Heritage Places in the Shire of Toodyay